Growth Factors is a bimonthly peer-reviewed scientific journal that covers research on the control of cell production and differentiation and survival. It is published by Informa Healthcare. The editor-in-chief is Steven Stacker (Peter MacCallum Cancer Centre).

External links 
 

Publications established in 1989
Molecular and cellular biology journals
Growth factors
Taylor & Francis academic journals
English-language journals
Bimonthly journals